Pozdyanka is a rural locality (a village) in Pereborskoye Rural Settlement, Beryozovsky District, Perm Krai, Russia. The population was 20 as of 2010. There are 5 streets.

Geography 
Pozdyanka is located 32 km north of  Beryozovka (the district's administrative centre) by road. Kuliga is the nearest rural locality.

References 

Rural localities in Beryozovsky District, Perm Krai